Zhenia Vasylkivska (6 January 1929 – 25 April 2021) was a Ukrainian poet and translator, literary critic, member of The New York Group of Poets.

Biography 
She was born in Kovel in 1929. Vasylkivska left Ukraine in 1944. She first lived in the Austrian city of Linz, where she graduated from high school. In 1951, she moved to the United States, where she settled in New York City.

She graduated from the United States with a degree in philology from Columbia University. She soon earned a doctorate in philosophy, defending her dissertation on the French poet Saint-John Perse. In 1968, she married Dr. C.F. Osgood.

After graduation, she taught French in various educational institutions, and later worked as a political consultant for the US government.

Published in New York's New Poetry in 1961 and 1962, she published a collection of original poems "Short Distances" (1959), as well as published translations of mostly French authors (poetry by Jacques Prever, "Antigone" by Jean Anouilh, etc.). She lived in Northern Virginia. Vasylkivska's poems are included in all three anthologies of New York group poets published at this time.

She died of natural causes on 25 April 2021, in Washington.

Bibliography 

 Own works

 Zhenya Vasylkivska (1959).  Short distances. New York: Association of Ukrainian Writers Slovo, 1959. 63 p.
  (Polish translation)  Żenia Wasylkiwska / Short distances (2019). Short distances. Translation from Ukrainian: Tadeusz Karabowicz. Lublin: Episteme. 187 s. ISBN 9788365172822 (bilingual edition: Polish and Ukrainian)

 Translations into Ukrainian

Jean Anouilh (1962).  Antigone. Introductory article and translation from French: Zhenya Vasylkivska. Munich:?. 64 pages

References 

1929 births
2021 deaths
Ukrainian women poets
Ukrainian women writers
Columbia University alumni
Columbia University faculty
American people of Ukrainian descent
People from Kovel